Herbert's supple skink (Subdoluseps herberti) is a species of skink found in Malaysia and Thailand.

References

Subdoluseps
Reptiles described in 1916
Taxa named by Malcolm Arthur Smith
Reptiles of the Malay Peninsula